Thomas Boude (May 17, 1752October 24, 1822) was a member of the United States House of Representatives from Pennsylvania.

Thomas Boude was born in Lancaster in the Province of Pennsylvania.  During the American Revolutionary War, he served as a lieutenant under Gen. Anthony Wayne with the Second, Fourth, and Fifth Pennsylvania Battalions from January 5, 1776, to November 3, 1783, and was promoted to captain and brevet major. Pennsylvania Archives state that on April 13, 1796, Governor Thomas Mifflin made him a General. He engaged in business as a lumber dealer in Columbia, Pennsylvania.  He was a member and one of the organizers of the Society of the Cincinnati.

He was a member of the Pennsylvania House of Representatives from 1794 to 1796 and was elected as a Federalist to the Seventh Congress.  However, he was an unsuccessful candidate for reelection in 1802 to the Eighth Congress.  He resumed his former business as a lumber dealer and died in Columbia, Pennsylvania, on October 24, 1822.  He is buried in that part of Mount Bethel Cemetery known as the "Brick Graveyard."

References

1752 births
1822 deaths
Politicians from Lancaster, Pennsylvania
People of colonial Pennsylvania
Federalist Party members of the United States House of Representatives from Pennsylvania
Members of the Pennsylvania House of Representatives
Continental Army officers from Pennsylvania